A list of animated television series first aired in 1976.

See also
 List of animated feature films of 1976
 List of Japanese animation television series of 1976

References

Television series
Animated series
1976
1976
1976-related lists